In the Schechter Letter, Serach is the wife of the Khazar ruler Sabriel. A Jew, she encourages her husband and other Khazars to convert to Judaism and establish it as the official religion of Khazaria.
Serach is not mentioned in the Khazar Correspondence or the Kuzari. 

Some scholars have postulated that the Khazar conversion to Judaism came as a result of contact with existing Jewish populations in the Crimea and the Caucasus, possibly the ancestors of the Krymchaks or Mountain Jews. As with so much of Khazar studies, the absence of documentary evidence renders the question of whether Serach belonged to one of these groups a matter of speculation.

See also
Yitzhak ha-Sangari

Khazar people
9th-century Jews
Medieval Jewish women